Queen Elizabeth School or Queen Elizabeth's School may refer to:

United Kingdom 
 England
Queen Elizabeth School, Kirkby Lonsdale, Cumbria
Queen Elizabeth's School for Girls, Barnet, London
Queen Elizabeth's School for Boys, Barnet, London
Queen Elizabeth's School, Wimborne Minster, Dorset
Queen Elizabeth's Hospital, an independent school for boys in Bristol
Queen Elizabeth High School, Bromyard, Herefordshire
Queen Elizabeth High School, Hexham, Northumberland
Queen Elizabeth's School, Crediton, Devon
Queen Elizabeth's High School, Gainsborough
Queen Elizabeth's Mercian School, Tamworth
Queen Elizabeth's Grammar School, Ashbourne, Derbyshire
Queen Elizabeth Grammar School, Wakefield, West Yorkshire
Queen Elizabeth's Academy, Mansfield, Nottinghamshire
The Queen Elizabeth Academy, Atherstone, Warwickshire
Queen Elizabeth School, Luton Bedfordshire
 Wales
Queen Elizabeth High School, Carmarthen, Carmarthenshire

Canada 
Queen Elizabeth School (Saskatoon), Saskatchewan, Canada
Queen Elizabeth School (Moncton), New Brunswick, Canada
Queen Elizabeth High School (Calgary), a public school in Alberta, Canada
Queen Elizabeth High School (Halifax), Canada
Queen Elizabeth High School (Edmonton), Alberta, Canada
Queen Elizabeth Secondary School, Surrey, British Columbia, Canada

Hong Kong 
Queen Elizabeth School, Hong Kong

See also
QE (disambiguation)
QEH (disambiguation)
Queen Elizabeth Elementary School (disambiguation)
Queen Elizabeth's Grammar School (disambiguation)
Queen's School (disambiguation)